Bugtussle is an unincorporated community in Monroe County, Kentucky, United States. It is located in the southern part of the county, immediately north of the Kentucky-Tennessee state line.  Kentucky Route 87 connects the community with Gamaliel to the northeast and Lafayette, Tennessee, to the southwest (the highway becomes Tennessee State Route 261 at the border).

Bugtussle was so named on account of doodlebugs being frequent there. The community has been noted on lists of unusual place names.

References

External links

Unincorporated communities in Monroe County, Kentucky
Unincorporated communities in Kentucky